Paradrillia himea is a species of sea snail, a marine gastropod mollusk in the family Horaiclavidae.

Description

Distribution
This marine species occurs off Japan. It was also found as a fossil in Pliocene strata of Japan.

References

 Makiyama, Jiro. "Molluscan fauna of the lower part of the Kakegawa Series in the province of Totomi, Japan." Memoirs of the College of Science, Kyoto Imperial University 3.1 (1927): 1–147. Hatai, Kotora, and Syozo Nisiyama. "Check list of Japanese Tertiary marine mollusca." 東北大學理科報告. 地質学 3 (1952): 1–464.]

External links
 

himea
Gastropods described in 1927